A Shalom Zachar (also: Sholom Zochor, Shulem Zucher, ; trans. Welcoming the male; lit. Peace be upon the male), is a gathering which takes place in Ashkenazi Jewish circles on the first Friday night after a baby boy is born. Although intended to "console" the newborn, the get-together is treated as a happy occasion.

Sources
The source for this practice is the ruling of the Moses Isserles in the Shulchan Aruch, Yoreh De'ah 265:12:

It is customary to make a festive meal on the Friday night after the birth of a baby boy. People go to the house where the baby is, to taste something [there], and this [eating] is also [considered] a seudat mitzvah.

David HaLevi Segal, a major commentator on the Rema, finds the source for the Rema's statement in the Talmudic tractate of Niddah (30b). Here the Talmud states that while a baby develops within the womb, "he is taught the entire Torah. However, as soon as he enters the air of this world, an angel comes and strikes him on his mouth, causing him to forget the entire Torah" (Taz, Yoreh Deah 265:13). Because the baby forgot all the Torah he learned, he is likened to a mourner. Just as people visit a mourner in his home to comfort him during the mourning period, people visit the home of the newborn to console him for the Torah he has forgotten.

Rabbi Yaakov Emden writes that this meal is called a Seudat Zachar (Meal of Remembrance), and is held specifically on Shabbat because that day is also connected with remembrance, as the Torah states, "Remember the Shabbat day to sanctify it" (Exodus 20:8).

The Terumat HaDeshen (269)  and the Kitzur Shulchan Aruch (163:8) consider the Shalom Zachar a Seudat mitzvah.

Customs
In current practice, the Shalom Zachar is an informal, drop-in gathering which takes place after the Friday night meal. The location of the gathering is determined by where the father of the new baby spends Shabbat, since he presides over the event. Thus, a Shalom Zachar usually takes place in the home of the newborn (even if the newborn is still in the hospital), although it may also take place at the home of grandparents, in-laws, or even friends with whom the father is spending Shabbat.

Typically, mainly men and boys drop by to convey their congratulations, to have a bite to eat, to share words of Torah, and to sing songs welcoming the newborn and thanking God for the birth. If the mother is already back home with the baby, female relatives or friends will usually drop by to visit her as well.

Typical light refreshments include cake, cookies, popcorn, pretzels, nuts and seeds, soft drinks, and beer. In addition, chickpeas are customarily served because they are a round-shaped food eaten by mourners (as they symbolize the cyclical nature of life). Beer is served as it is cheap and most can afford to buy it.

A Shalom Zachar is not held when this Friday night coincides with the night of Yom Kippur or the night of the Passover Seder. Yom Kippur is a fast day, and therefore all eating and drinking is forbidden. On the night of the Passover Seder, it is forbidden to eat anything after eating the afikomen, which is eaten at the end of the meal. If the Shalom Zachar falls on a Friday night during any other day of Passover, matzah cakes and potato-flour cookies will be served instead of regular flour cakes and cookies.

Brit Yitzchak
Sephardic Jews do not hold a Shalom Zachar. Instead, their custom is to conduct a gathering called a Brit Yitzchak on the evening preceding the newborn boy's brit milah.

Sources
Shalom Zachor - The Action Plan, Torah.org.
It's a boy, Aish.com
The Shalom Zachor, by Larry Fine
What is Shalom Zachor?, Chabad.org

Jewish law and rituals
Judaism and children
Birth in Judaism
Hebrew words and phrases in Jewish law